"Reckless" is the fifth song off the album, Wild Like Children by Omaha, Nebraska-based band, Tilly and the Wall. It was released as a limited edition 7" on Trash Aesthetics on February 6, 2006.

Track listing
 "Reckless"
 "In Two Glasses of Wine"
 "Pictures of Houses"

External links
Tilly and the Wall official website
Tilly and the Wall on MySpace

2006 singles